Reinel is a surname. Notable people with the surname include:

Gonzalo Gutiérrez Reinel (born 1955), Peruvian diplomat
Jorge Reinel (c. 1502–after 1572), Portuguese cartographer and instructor in cartography, son of the well-known cartographer Pedro Reinel
Pedro Reinel (c. 1462–c. 1542), Portuguese cartographer, author of one of the oldest signed Portuguese nautical charts

References